Dr Howard Marshall OBE (20 December 1870 – 9 October 1929) was an English rugby union half-back who played club rugby for Blackheath and Richmond and was a member of the first official British Isles tour in 1891. Marshall played just one game for England, scoring a hat-trick of tries on his debut.

Personal life
Marshall was born in Sunderland in 1870 to John Ferrow Marshall, a ship-owner. He was educated at several schools, including Barnard Castle and Norfolk County, before gaining entry into Caius College, Cambridge in 1888. Although Marshall would later have a notable rugby career, he did not win a sporting Blue while at Cambridge.

Marshall first entered medicine when he joined the medical college, St. Bartholomew's, becoming a House Surgeon and the Clinical Assistant in the Throat Department. He later became an Assistant House Surgeon at Nottingham General Hospital, before becoming a General practitioner at Bexhill-on-Sea and Cirencester. From 1910 he became a surgeon at Cirencester Memorial Hospital. Marshall was the medical officer to the Royal Agricultural College in Cirencester and was also the civil surgeon to the 4th Battalion of the Gloucester Regiment. On the outbreak of World War I, Bingham Hall in Cirencester was turned into a Red Cross Hospital and Marshall was made medical officer in charge of it. For his services in Cirencester during the war he was awarded the OBE.

Rugby career

Marshall played for several club teams during his rugby career, and in 1890 he was representing first-class English team Blackheath. That season saw William Percy Carpmael, a fellow Blackheath player, form the invitational touring team, the Barbarians; and Marshall was asked to join the club on their first tour. On the first tour Marshall had the distinction of scoring the first ever points in Wales by a Barbarian player, when he scored a try against Cardiff. Marshall later became a committee member for the Barbarians.

In 1891 Marshall was selected for another rugby first, when he was chosen to represent the British Isles team on their first official overseas tour. Played in South Africa, the British Isles team faced 17 regional and invitational teams, and three international Tests against South Africa national team. Marshall played in two international games, paired with Edward Bromet in the Second Test at Kimberley and then with Arthur Rotherham in the third and final Test, at Cape Town.

In 1893 Marshall played his one and only England international tour when he was selected to face Wales as part of the Home Nations Championship. The game became famous after the pitch was prevented from freezing over when hundreds of braziers were left burning on the pitch over night; leaving multiple black circles on the pitch during the match. Marshall had an incredible debut, scoring a hat-trick of tries, but incredibly finished on the losing side after a great Welsh come back. Despite his high try scoring debut, this was his only international cap for England.

Bibliography

References

1870 births
1929 deaths
20th-century English medical doctors
Alumni of Gonville and Caius College, Cambridge
Barbarian F.C. players
Blackheath F.C. players
British & Irish Lions rugby union players from England
England international rugby union players
English rugby union players
Officers of the Order of the British Empire
People educated at Barnard Castle School
Richmond F.C. players
Rugby union players from Sunderland